The 2001 Gujarat earthquake, also known as the Bhuj earthquake, occurred on 26 January at . The epicentre was about 9 km south-southwest of the village of Chobari in Bhachau Taluka of Kutch District of Gujarat, India.

The intraplate earthquake measured 7.6 on the moment magnitude scale and occurred at  depth. It had a maximum felt intensity of X (Extreme) on the Mercalli intensity scale. The earthquake killed  13,805 to 20,023 people (including 18 in southeastern Pakistan), injured another 167,000 and destroyed nearly 340,000 buildings.

Tectonic setting

Gujarat lies 300–400 km from the plate boundary between the Indian Plate and the Eurasian Plate, but the current tectonics are still governed by the effects of the continuing continental collision along this boundary. During the break-up of Gondwana in the Jurassic, this area was affected by rifting with a roughly west–east trend. During the collision with Eurasia the area has undergone shortening, involving both reactivation of the original rift faults and development of new low-angle thrust faults. The related folding has formed a series of ranges, particularly in central Kutch.

The focal mechanism of most earthquakes is consistent with reverse faulting on reactivated rift faults. The pattern of uplift and subsidence associated with the 1819 Rann of Kutch earthquake is consistent with reactivation of such a fault.

The 2001 Gujarat earthquake was caused by movement on a previously unknown south-dipping fault, trending parallel to the inferred rift structures. No major surface ruptures were associated with the shock, classifying it as a blind thrust earthquake. Lateral spreading was widely reported and strike-slip faulting was observed at Bharodia and Manfara.

Impact

Although the death toll varies mainly between 13,805 and 20,023, earlier reports had put the death toll at 125,000, a significant overestimate. Bhuj, which was situated only 20 km away from the epicentre, was devastated. Considerable damage also occurred in Bhachau and Anjar with hundreds of villages flattened in Taluka of Anjar, Bhuj and Bhachau. Over one million structures were damaged or destroyed, including many historic buildings and tourist attractions. The quake destroyed around 40% of homes, eight schools, two hospitals and 4 km of road in Bhuj, and partly destroyed the city's historic Swaminarayan temple and historic forts, Prag Mahal and Aina Mahal. The Indian National Trust for Arts and Cultural Heritage (INTACH) inspected more than 250 heritage buildings in Kutch and Saurashtra and found that about 40% of them are either collapsed or seriously damaged. Only 10% were undamaged. A public hospital collapsed in Bhuj, killing about 150 patients inside. 

In Ahmedabad, Gujarat's commercial capital with a population of approximately 8.2 million (according to data in 2011), as many as 80 multi-storey buildings collapsed and 729 people were killed. Total property damage was estimated at $7.5 billion. In Kutch, the earthquake destroyed about 60% of food and water supplies and around 258,000 houses, 90% of the district's housing stock. The biggest setback was the total demolition of the Bhuj Civil hospital. The Indian military provided emergency support which was later augmented by the International Federation of Red Cross and Red Crescent Society. A temporary Red Cross hospital remained in Bhuj to provide care while a replacement hospital was built.

Reconstruction 
Four months after the earthquake the Gujarat government announced the Gujarat Earthquake Reconstruction and Rehabilitation Policy. The policy proposed a different approach to urban and rural construction with the estimated cost of rebuilding to be US$1.77 billion.

The main objectives of the policy included repairing, building, and strengthening houses and public buildings. Other objectives included the revival of the economy, health support, and reconstruction of the community and social infrastructure.

Housing 
The housing policies focused on the removal of rubble, setting up temporary shelters, full reconstruction of damaged houses, and the retrofitting of undamaged units. The policy established a community-driven housing recovery process. The communities affected by the earthquake were given the option for complete or partial relocation to in-situ reconstruction. The total number of eligible houses to be repaired was 929,682 and the total number of eligible houses to be reconstructed was 213,685. By 2003, 882,896 (94%) houses were repaired and 113,271 (53%) were reconstructed.

City planning 
The Environmental Planning Collaborative (EPC) was commissioned to provide a new city plan for the city of Bhuj. The plan focused on creating a wider roadway network to provide emergency access to the city. The EPC used land readjustment (LR) in the form of eight town planning schemes. This was implemented by deducting land from private lot sizes to create adequate public land for the widening of roadways. The remaining land was readjusted and given back to the original owners as final plots.

Relief 

In order to support the reconstruction and rehabilitation of the city, the Government of Gujarat created four assistance packages worth up to US$1 billion. These packages assisted about 300,000 families. The government also announced a US$2.5 million package to revive small, medium, and cottage industries. The World Bank and the Asian Development Bank also provided loans worth $300 million and $500 million, respectively.

Assistance was offered from many countries and organisations.

Memorials

Smritivan, a memorial park and museum dedicated to victims of the earthquake was built on top of Bhujia Hill in Bhuj and opened in 2022. Spread over an area of 470 acre, it has more than 13,805 trees, each dedicated to a victim, planted in the garden and 108 small water reservoirs created on the hill. 

Veer Balak Smarak in Anjar is memorial dedicated to 185 school children and 20 teachers who died during the earthquake.

See also

 Earthquake zones of India
 List of earthquakes in 2001
 List of earthquakes in India

References

External links

M7.7 Bhuj "Republic Day" Earthquake, 2001 –  Amateur Seismic Centre
26 January 2001 Bhuj earthquake, Gujarat, India – University of Colorado
Gujarat Earthquake of January 26, 2001 – Indian Institute of Technology Kanpur
Israel Defence Forces relief efforts

2001 earthquakes
Gujarat earthquake
2001
2016 earthquake
History of Ahmedabad
History of Kutch
Earthquakes in India
January 2001 events in India
Buried rupture earthquakes
Bhuj
Events in Ahmedabad